Hari Habrian (born 28 April 1992) is an Indonesian professional footballer who plays as a midfielder for Liga 2 club PSMS Medan.

Club career

Persita Tangerang
He made his debut when against Persikabo Bogor in first week 2016 Indonesia Soccer Championship B.

References

External links
 
 

1992 births
Indonesian footballers
Living people
People from Serang
Liga 2 (Indonesia) players
Persita Tangerang players
Cilegon United players
Perserang Serang players
Sriwijaya F.C. players
PSMS Medan players
Association football midfielders
Sportspeople from Banten